The 2014–15 Elite Ice Hockey League season is the 12th season of the Elite Ice Hockey League. The regular season begins early September and will end in March.

On 30 April 2014, the Elite League announced changes to the import rules, as from the 2014–15 season, the number of non British-trained players would rise from 11 to 12, while the number of work-permit players would remain at 11.  The number of non British-trained players would then rise to 13 in season 2015-16 and 14 in season 2016-17, with the number of work-permit players again remaining at 11.

The EIHL lost some top British players such as Jonathan Weaver and Danny Meyers along with Matt Towe and Sam Zajac to the EPIHL, the first team to take advantage of the rule changes was the Steelers with them announcing the signing of British/Canadian Rod Sarich.

Teams

The ten teams were split into two conferences. Teams played the sides in their conferences four times, home and away (32 games), and played the sides in the other conferences twice, home and away (20 games).

Conference champions Braehead Clan and Sheffield Steelers took the top two spots in the league, but neither side could continue their success in the playoffs, which was won by Coventry Blaze, who beat the Steelers 4-2 in the final.

The Challenge Cup went to the Cardiff Devils, with the Steelers again finishing runners-up, losing 2-1. 

Erhardt Conference

Gardiner Conference

Standings

Overall

Erhardt Conference
Only intra-conference games counted towards the Erhardt Conference standings. Each team played the other four teams in the Conference eight times, for a total of 32 matches.

Gardiner Conference
Only intra-conference games counted towards the Gardiner Conference standings. Each team played the other four teams in the Conference eight times, for a total of 32 matches.

League Officials

Match Officials
Referees:  
Tom Darnell, Mike Hicks, James Ashton, Jonny Liptrott, Dean Smith, Neil Wilson and Stefan Hogarth.

Linesmen:  
Scott Dalgleish, Andrew Dalton, Ally Flockhart, Pavel Halas, James Kavanagh, Sam Motton, Gordon Pirry, Danny Beresford, Matt Rose, Luke Palmer, Paul Brooks, Paul Staniforth and Lee Young.

References

Elite Ice Hockey League seasons
1
United